Star Wars Battle Pod is a 2014 arcade game based on the franchise Star Wars. It was unveiled at the New York Comic-Con on October 8, 2014.

Gameplay 
The game consists of multiple scenarios that correspond with major battles in the original trilogy. There are six scenarios:

 The Battle of Yavin (Yavin) from Star Wars where the player is placed in an X-wing attacking the Death Star to prevent it from destroying Yavin 4. 
 The Battle of Hoth (Hoth) from The Empire Strikes Back where the player pilots a snowspeeder to assist in the evacuation of Hoth from invading Imperial forces. 
 A speeder run through Endor (Endor) where the player helps Han Solo make it to the shield generator to destroy the Death Star's shield for the Rebels in space.
 The Battle of Endor (Death Star II) from Return of the Jedi, which places the player in the cockpit of the Millennium Falcon to try to destroy the Death Star II and end the war. 
 There is one mission that does not follow the storyline of the movies but sets its own path (Vader's Revenge). It takes place immediately after the destruction of the first Death Star at Yavin where the player plays as Darth Vader who is trying to prevent the Rebels from salvaging the still-functional core of the Death Star's super laser with the ability to eliminate Han Solo in the process. 
 Another version of the game adds a scene from The Force Awakens, where the player pilots a T-70 X-Wing to engage First Order ships on Takodana and protect General Leia's transport.

The arcade cabinet comes in two versions: the environmental version with the dome screen, and a smaller version, but still sit-down, with a flat screen TV.

See also
 Star Wars Trilogy Arcade
 Star Wars: Racer Arcade
 Mach Storm
 Mobile Suit Gundam: Bonds of the Battlefield

References

External links

2014 video games
Arcade video games
Arcade-only video games
Bandai Namco games
Rail shooters
Star Wars arcade games
Star Wars video games
Unreal Engine games
Video games developed in Japan